Federico Fagioli (born 27 March 1991) is an Argentine social activist and politician, currently serving as National Deputy representing Buenos Aires Province. A member of the minor People's Left Party / La Dignidad People's Movement and the Patria Grande Front, he sits in the Frente de Todos bloc. Additionally, Fagioli is also involved in the CTEP-UTEP, the informal sector workers' union.

Early and personal life
Fagioli was born on 27 March 1991 in Quilmes, in the Greater Buenos Aires conurbation. His mother is a schoolteacher, and he has two siblings. When he was little, his family moved to Cipolletti, Río Negro, where they lived until Fagioli's father left the family. They moved back to the Greater Buenos Aires area when Fagioli was 16 years old. After a brief attempt at studying psychology, in 2009 Fagioli became involved with the Movimiento Popular La Dignidad. His activism was centered on informal sector workers' rights.

Fagioli presently resides in Pueblo Unido, in Glew. Pueblo Unido is a settlement founded by land occupations in which Fagioli partook, alongside some 120 other families. He is irreligious.

Political activism
Fagioli co-founded, alongside other villero activists, the Corriente Villera Independiente (CVI). The CVI seeks to push for the urbanization of villas (informal settlements) in the City of Buenos Aires, and in 2014, Fagioli participated in one of the CVI's most important political internvetions: setting up a large tent by the Obelisk of Buenos Aires while staging a protest demanding the declaration of an habitational emergency.

Fagioli participated in the making of a National Survey on Popular Neighbourhoods (Relevamiento Nacional de Barrios Populares, RENABAP). Additionally, he has been active in the CTEP-UTEP, the informal sector workers' union, founded by Juan Grabois.

In 2016, Fagioli co-founded alongside other members of the Movimiento Popular La Dignidad the People's Left Party (Izquierda Popular); the party's purpoted goal was to "build a new political project that takes up on the people's historical programmes, in order to attain true independence". In 2018, People's Left joined other left-wing political groups and parties in forming the Patria Grande Front.

National Deputy

Ahead of the 2019 general election, the Patria Grande Front selected Fagioli to be their candidate in the Frente de Todos list to the Chamber of Deputies in Buenos Aires Province; Fagioli was the 21st candidate. Despite not being elected, Fagioli took office on 19 December 2019 in place of Eduardo de Pedro, who resigned in order to become Interior Minister in President Alberto Fernández's cabinet.

Incident in Bolivia
Fagioli was part of the Argentine delegation invited by the Plurinational Legislative Assembly of Bolivia to observe the general election held that country in October 2020. Upon the delegation's arrival in La Paz Airport, however, Fagioli was controversially detained and kept in custody of the authorities. The Bolivian Minister of the Interior, Arturo Morillo, stated that Fagioli had been warned not to return to Bolivia after his participation in a previous Argentine delegation that visited the country following the ousting of Evo Morales in 2019, and that Fagioli was a "persona non grata" in Bolivia. In addition to Fagioli's detention, other members of the Argentine delegation, including other lawmakers, were also allegedly mistreated by Bolivian security forces. The incident was harshly criticized by President Alberto Fernández and MAS candidate Luis Arce, as well as the Juntos por el Cambio-led Argentine opposition in Congress.

Electoral history

References

External links

Profile on the official website of the Chamber of Deputies (in Spanish)

Living people
1991 births
People from Quilmes
People from Cipolletti
Members of the Argentine Chamber of Deputies elected in Buenos Aires Province
21st-century Argentine politicians